Quito, officially the Metropolitan District of Quito, is a canton in the province of Pichincha, Ecuador.

Governance

The canton is governed by the same mayor and city council that govern the city of Quito.

Population figures
According to the 2001 census, the total population of Quito (not the city itself) is 1,839,853, with 892,570 men and 947,283 women. According to the 2007 estimates, it is 1,840,000. Of this, the population of the urban parishes (the city of Quito itself) was 1,399,378, and the population of the rural parishes (outside of the city of Quito but still within the canton) was 440,475. The total population density of the canton is 439.8 inhabitants per km² (1139.1/mi²). The total number of households in the canton is 555,928, with 419,845 in the urban area (the city) and 136,083 in the rural area. Of the 1,407,526 inhabitants of the canton over the age of 12, 639,068 are married, 541,758 are single, 33,116 are divorced, 30,898 are separated, and 47,930 are widowed.

Overall, the canton's illiteracy rate is 4.3% – 5.3% for women, 3.2% for men, 3.6% in the urban area (the city), and 6.6% in the rural area. The unemployment rate of the city is 8.9%, and 43.8% are underemployed. The average monthly income is $317.

Political divisions
The canton is divided into 55 parishes, classified as either urban or rural. The canton has more parishes than any other canton in Ecuador. The urban parishes make up the city of Quito. (map):

Rural parishes
Alangasi
Amaguaña
Alangasí
Atahualpa
Calacalí
Calderón
Chabezpamba
Checa
Cumbayá
Gualea
Gualea Cruz
Guangopolo
Guayllabamba
Llano Chico
Lloa
Merced, La
Nanegal
Nanegalito
Nayón
Nono
Pacto
Perucho
Pifo
Pintag
Pomasqui
Puellaro
Puembo
El Quinche
San Antonio de Pichincha
San José de Minas
Tababela
Tumbaco
Yaruquí
ZámbizaUrban parishesArgelia, La
Belisario Quevedo
Carcelén
Centro Histórico
Chilibulo
Chillogallo
Chimbacalle
Cochapamba
Comité del Pueblo
Concepción, La
Condado, El
Cotocollao
Ecuatoriana, La
Ferroviaria, La
Guamaní
Inca, El
Iñaquito
Itchimbía
Jipijapa
Kennedy
La Libertad
Magdalena
Mariscal Sucre
Mena, La
Ponceano
Puengasí
Quitumbe
Rumipamba
San Bartolo
San Juan
Solanda
Turubamba

Administrative zones
The canton is divided into 11 administrative zones that decentralize the municipality and participate in a system of active management. Each zone, classified as either urban or suburban, has their own administrator and contain can both urban and rural parishes. They are (parishes covered in parenthesis):UrbanSur
(Chillogallo, La Ecuatoriana, Guamaní, Quitumbe, Turubamba)
Centro Sur
(La Argelia, Chilibulo, Chimbacalle, La Ferrovaria, Lloa, La Magdalena, La Mena, San Bartolo, Solanda)
Centro
(Centro Histórico, Itchimbia, La Libertad, Puengasí, San Juan)
Norte
(Belisario Quevedo, Cochapamba, La Concepción, El Inca, Iñaquito, Jipijapa, Kennedy, Mariscal Sucre, Nayón, Rumipamba, Zámbiza)
Centro Norte
(Calacalí, Carcelén, Comité del Pueblo, El Concado, Cotocallao, Nono, Pomasquí, Ponceano, San Antonio)Suburban'''
Noroccidental
(Gualea, Nanegal, Nanegalito, Pacto)
Norcentral
(Atahualpa, Chavezpamba, Perucho, Puellero, San José de Minas)
Calderón
(Calderón, Llano Chico)
Tumbaco
(Cumbayá, Tumbaco)
Los Chillos
(Alangasí, Amaguaña, Conocoto, Guangopolo, La Merced, Pintag)
Aeropuerto
(Checa, Guayllabamba, Pifo, Puembo, El Quinche, Tababela, Yaruquí)

References

 
Cantons of Pichincha Province